The freestyle skiing competition of the 2010 Winter Olympics was held at Cypress Mountain.  The events took place between the 13 and 25 February 2010, and included a new event for these Olympics, ski cross.

Medal summary

Medal table

Men's Events

Women's Events

Events 
Six freestyle skiing events was held at Vancouver 2010:

Competition schedule 
All times are Pacific Standard Time (UTC-8).

Qualification 
For the six events, there are a maximum 180 athletes allowed to compete. This includes a maximum of 30 in moguls, 25 in aerials, and 35 in ski cross, applicable for both genders. No nation can have more than 18 skiers with maximum of ten men or ten women per specific nation. For each event, no nation can enter more than four skiers per individual event.

Skiers are qualified if they have placed in the top 30 in an FIS World Cup event of FIS World Championships in the event concerned. A minimum of 100 FIS points in the respective event. Host nation Canada is expected to enter a skier in all events. If no skier meets the qualification standards, they can enter one skier per event.

Quota allocation will be given using the World Ranking List (WRL) for the twelve-month period of World Cup Standings from the 2008–09 and 2009-10 Freestyle World Cup and the FIS Freestyle World Ski Championships 2009. It will be assigned one slot per skier from the top the WRL downwards. When a nation has the maximum four skiers per event, the next eligible nation on the WRL will be given a slot until the maximum total per event in moguls, aerials, and ski cross per gender has been reached.

In the case at nation is given more than 18 skiers, it is up the nation to select the team of a maximum of 18 skiers by 25 January 2010. Once quota slots are allocated by the FIS and the national entries confirmed, a reallocation of unused slots per event will be made by the FIS to the next eligible nation on the WRL for quota allocation in the respective event and gender. This process started on 18 January 2010 and will run until 28 January 2010. Deadline to VANOC is 1 February 2010.

Participating nations

References 

 May 2009 FIS Qualification for the 2010 Winter Olympics. - accessed 22 January 2010. Freestyle skiing is on pages 11–13.
 Vancouver 2010 Olympic Winter Games Competition Schedule v12

External links
 Ottawa Citizen: "Moguls glossary" - 2010 Winter Games
 CanWest News Service: "Ski Cross glossary"  - 2010 Winter Games
 Official Results Book – Freestyle Skiing

 
2010
2010 Winter Olympics events
2010 in freestyle skiing